Warner McPherson (April 5, 1935 – March 1, 2022), known professionally as Warner Mack, was an American country music singer-songwriter. Mack had 23 hits on the country charts from the late 1950s to the early 1980s.

Life
Mack was born in Nashville, Tennessee, on April 5, 1935. His string of hits included "Is It Wrong (For Loving You)" in 1957 and in 1965 "The Bridge Washed Out".

On April 27, 2020, Mack was interviewed by Scott Wikle for the My Kind Of Country show. At age 85, Mack announced the release of a new album entitled Better Than Ever.

Mack died on March 1, 2022, in Nashville, at the age of 86.

Discography

Albums

Singles

References

External links
 Official website
 Warner Mack recordings at the Discography of American Historical Recordings
 
 

1935 births
2022 deaths
American country singer-songwriters
Decca Records artists
Musicians from Nashville, Tennessee